The following is a list of museums with mummies from Egypt on display, as well as information on them when applicable.

Africa

Egypt 

 National Museum of Egyptian Civilization, Cairo

Europe

Britain 

 British Museum, London
 Maidstone Museum, Kent - Ta-Kush; c.700-650BC
 Weston Park Museum, Sheffield - Nesitanebetasheru and Djedma’atiuesankh; 720-650 BCE

North America

Canada 

 Royal Ontario Museum, Toronto, Ontario - Nine total
 Nakht - Twentieth Dynasty of Egypt
 Nefer-Mut
 Djedmaatesankh - 9th Century BCE
 Antjau - 26th Dynasty of Egypt

United States of America

A-I 

 Joseph Moore Museum, Richmond, Indiana
 Wayne County Historical Museum, Richmond, Indiana

J-Z 

 Berkshire Museum, Pittsfield, Massachusetts - Pahat, 332 to 30 BCE
 Louisiana Art and Science Museum, Baton Rouge, Louisiana
 Grand Rapids Public Museum, Grand Rapids, Michigan
 Kalamazoo Valley Museum, Kalamazoo, Michigan -  Tjenet-nefer
 Metropolitan Museum of Art, New York City, New York
 Reading Public Museum, West Reading, Pennsylvania - Nefrina 
 Albany Institute of History and Art, Albany, New York, USA - Ankhefenmut, 21st dynasty

Oceania

New Zealand 

 Canterbury Museum, Christchurch, New Zealand - Tash Pen Khonsu, dated to 185 BCE

See also 

 List of museums of Egyptian antiquities

References 

Egyptian Antiquities
Museums with Mummies
Ancient Egypt-related lists